Weed World Candies sells lollipops. The lollipops are marketed and sold in vans across the United States. With advertising on the vans depicting cannabis plants next to lollipops, strong euphemism suggests a cannabis flavor or the possibility of intoxication after eating the lollipops. The candy sold from the vans does not contain THC.

See also
Candy cigarette
Hippy Sippy
Gateway drug effect
Joe Camel

References

External links
 

Cannabis food companies
Hemp
Lollipops
Confectionery companies of the United States